Tulu Bolo (Oromo: Tullu Bolloo) is a town located in the Southwest Shewa Zone of the Oromia Region, Ethiopia. It is the largest settlement in Becho woreda. It is located around 80 Kilometers from Adis Ababa(Finfinne) (the capital city of Oromia) on the way to Jimma. it is named after 'Tullu' mountain and 'Bolo' a sink, to mean a town located near a mountain in Afan Oromo after the King Aba Gifar of Jimma visited through their route to Addis Ababa. Different churches and mosques to visit and pray.

Demographics 
Based on figures from the Central Statistical Agency in 2005, Tulu Bolo has an estimated total population of 14,307 of whom 6,837 are men and 7,470 are women. The 1994 national census reported this town had a total population of 8,011 of whom 3,708 were men and 4,303 were women. Hibret Firee Senior secondary school, Fitawrari Habte Giorgis school (named after a known patriot in the Italian battle of Adwoa), and Tulu Bolo elementary school are known for graduating high caliber students. There are also a number of kinder gardens. Hibret Firee Senior secondary school was constructed by the contribution of money from farmers of the then Dawo, Illu, Bacho, Arbu cholule, Tole and Bussa Woredas in 1976 E.C.  A natural hot spring (Tsebele) that has aesthetic and medicinal value is located in the eastern part of the town and for bath and part of it also supplied for drinking through pipes(oo, named after oromic word ho'a means hot water). It is usually visited by tourists. A sports field and other recreational sites are also available in the central vicinity (Menafesha). A number of Hotels are existing and some are under construction. The construction in the city is booming. The pioneer and the oldest part in the town which was the center for a long time (Aroge Sefer) situated near the Mazegaga. A seasonal river Meja. In the outskirts of the way of Adis Ababa Kenteri Sefer and Busa Sefer. (..TTW..)

Notes

Cities and towns in Oromia Region